"Temptation" is a song by Canadian rock band The Tea Party from the album Transmission. It was released as a single in Australia and a promotional single in Canada and the United States. The music video was shot in Toronto.

"Temptation" is a standard three-piece rock song with keyboard accompaniment and an introduction composed of tar (lute) and a sped-up sample of Led Zeppelin's "When the Levee Breaks".

The song ranked #5 on CILQ-FM's Top 107 songs of 1997.

Trivia
An instrumental of this song was used in Trailer Park Boys: The Movie.
Also, this song was featured on the soundtrack of the video game Road Rash 3D.
Additionally, this song was a track on the EA Sports NHL 2002 video game soundtrack.
The song is covered by Nevermore and released as bonus song on their album The Obsidian Conspiracy
This song is The Tea Party's only US Chart entry (US Billboard Active Rock Chart #36 ).

Track listing 
"Temptation"
"The River (Alhambra Tour)"
"Pulse"

Charts

References

External links
 The music video

1997 singles
The Tea Party songs
1997 songs
EMI Records singles